Chryseobacterium frigidisoli  is a Gram-negative, rod-shaped, psychrotolerant and aerobic bacteria from the genus of Chryseobacterium which has been isolated from the permafrost of a glacier from the Larsemann Hills in the Antarctica.

References

Further reading

External links
Type strain of Chryseobacterium frigidisoli at BacDive -  the Bacterial Diversity Metadatabase

frigidisoli
Bacteria described in 2013
Psychrophiles